Diario de Cádiz is a Spanish-language newspaper published in Cádiz, Spain. The paper serves the province of Cádiz.

History and profile
Diario de Cádiz was first published on 16 June 1867 by Federico Joly Velasco. The paper had its headquarters in Cádiz.

In 2006 Diario de Cádiz sold 29,004 copies.

See also
List of newspapers in Spain

References

External links
 Official website 

1867 establishments in Spain
Mass media in Cádiz
Daily newspapers published in Spain
Newspapers established in 1867
Spanish-language newspapers